Adventures in Standards is an album of Broadway show tunes by the Stan Kenton Orchestra recorded in 1961 for Capitol Records but not released until 1975 on Kenton's Creative World label.

Track listing
 "Some Enchanted Evening" (Richard Rodgers, Oscar Hammerstein II) - 3:36
 "Begin the Beguine" (Cole Porter) - 3:37
 "It's All Right With Me" (Porter) - 2:31
 "Make Someone Happy" (Jule Styne, Adolph Green, Betty Comden) - 3:17
 "Old Devil Moon" (Burton Lane, Yip Harburg) - 3:02  
 "Gigi" (Frederick Lowe, Alan Jay Lerner) - 3:07
 "Come Rain or Come Shine" (Harold Arlen, Johnny Mercer) - 2:35  
 "Almost Like Being in Love" (Lowe, Lerner) - 2:32
 "Just in Time" (Jule Styne, Comden, Green) - 2:03
 "If I Were a Bell" (Frank Loesser) - 2:12  
 "Bewitched, Bothered and Bewildered" (Rodgers, Lorenz Hart) - 2:38
 "I've Grown Accustomed to Her Face" (Loew, Lerner) - 2:35 
Recorded at Capitol Studios in Hollywood, CA on December 5, 1961 (tracks 1, 4, 6 & 7), December 6, 1961 (tracks 3, 11 & 12), December 7, 1961 (tracks 2, 5, 9 & 10) and December 14, 1961 (track 8).

Personnel
Stan Kenton - piano, conductor
Bob Behrendt, Norman Baltazar, Bob Rolfe, Dalton Smith, Marvin Stamm - trumpet
Dee Barton, Bob Fitzpatrick, Bud Parker - trombone
Jim Amlotte, - bass trombone
Dave Wheeler - bass trombone, tuba
Dwight Carver, Keith LaMotte, Carl Saunders, Ray Starling - mellophone
Gabe Baltazar - alto saxophone
Buddy Arnold, Paul Renzi - tenor saxophone
Allan Beutler - baritone saxophone
Joel Kaye - baritone saxophone, bass saxophone
Pat Senatore - bass 
Jerry McKenzie - drums
Lennie Niehaus - arranger

References

Stan Kenton albums
1975 albums
Albums conducted by Stan Kenton

Albums recorded at Capitol Studios
Albums produced by Lee Gillette